Aulacothorax copalinus is a species of flea beetle in the family Chrysomelidae, and formerly placed in the genus Orthaltica. It is found in North America.

References

Alticini
Articles created by Qbugbot
Beetles described in 1801
Taxa named by Johan Christian Fabricius